William Mooney may refer to:
 William Mooney (actor), American actor
 William C. Mooney, U.S. Representative from Ohio
 William Mooney (cricketer), Irish cricketer